Alexandre Émond (born 25 May 1984 in Laval, Quebec) is a Canadian judoka. He competed at the 2012 Summer Olympics in the 90 kg event and was eliminated in the first round by the British judoka Winston Gordon. Émond has enjoyed success at the Pan American Judo Championships winning two gold, one silver and two bronze medals between 2008 and 2012. He also won the bronze medal at the 2011 Pan American Games.

See also 

 Judo in Quebec
 Judo in Canada
 List of Canadian judoka

References

External links
Alexandre Emond at JudoInside

1984 births
Living people
Canadian male judoka
Judoka at the 2012 Summer Olympics
Olympic judoka of Canada
Pan American Games bronze medalists for Canada
Pan American Games medalists in judo
Sportspeople from Laval, Quebec
Judoka at the 2011 Pan American Games
Medalists at the 2011 Pan American Games
20th-century Canadian people
21st-century Canadian people